Li Bun-hui (born December 29, 1968) is a former table tennis player from North Korea who competed in the 1992 Summer Olympics.

Table tennis career
She won eight World Table Tennis Championship medals. She won a bronze medal at the 1983 World Table Tennis Championships in the Corbillon Cup (women's team event).

Two years later she won a silver medal in the women's team and during the 1987 World Table Tennis Championships she won a bronze in the women's doubles with Cho Jung-hui.

Her next medals came in the singles at the 1989 and 1991 and also in 1991 she won a mixed doubles bronze with Kim Song-hui and a gold medal in the team event with Hong Cha-ok, Hyun Jung-hwa and Yu Sun-bok in a unified Korean team. Her final medal was a silver in 1993 in the team event.

Personal life
She is married to Kim Song-hui, also a former table tennis player who represented North Korea, and has a son. Her name is also frequently written in English as Li Bun-hui.

In popular culture

Film
The story of the Unified Korean team in the 1991 World Championships and its victory over the Chinese in the women's team event is told by the movie As One starring actress Bae Doo-na as Li Bun-hui.

See also
 List of table tennis players
 List of World Table Tennis Championships medalists

References

External links

1969 births
Living people
North Korean female table tennis players
Table tennis players at the 1992 Summer Olympics
Olympic table tennis players of North Korea
Olympic bronze medalists for North Korea
Olympic medalists in table tennis
Medalists at the 1992 Summer Olympics
Asian Games medalists in table tennis
Table tennis players at the 1990 Asian Games
Asian Games bronze medalists for North Korea
Medalists at the 1990 Asian Games
20th-century North Korean women